Capital Region is one of the regions of Veracruz, Mexico.

Geography
The Capital Region is in the central part of the state. It extends from the seacoast on the east to the mountains of the Trans-Mexican Volcanic Belt on the west. It is bounded on the north by Nautla Region, on the east by the Gulf of Mexico, on the south by Sotavento and Mountains regions, and on the west by the state of Puebla.

References 

Regions of Veracruz